William Neale (1872–1901) was an English footballer who played in the Football League for West Bromwich Albion.

References

1872 births
1901 deaths
English footballers
Association football inside forwards
English Football League players
West Bromwich Albion F.C. players
Brierley Hill Alliance F.C. players